Notre Dame Fighting Irish basketball may refer to:
Notre Dame Fighting Irish men's basketball
Notre Dame Fighting Irish women's basketball